Manuel C. Rodrigues  (1908–1991) was an early Goan poet and writer, who expressed himself in the English language. He was also an artist, as well as a trained singer and conductor. He is also known as Manoel C. Rodrigues.

Selected works

Verse
 Selected Poems, Bombay 1978. Rs 10.
 Homeward, G. V. Bhave, 1939.

Short stories
 Still-life and other stories, Coastal Observer, 1984.

Essays, etc

 'Armando Menezes: The Lyrist, A fundamentally religious poet'. The Goan World, Bombay, Jan. 1939, 31.
 'Mar-Jakin', Goa Today, August 1976.

References to work

Critic and Professor at the Department of English, University of Iowa, Peter Nazareth list his work in the context of his (Nazareth's) experiences while creating an early (1983) anthology of Goan literature.

In his essay on nostalgia, the lament of the "Goan exile" and the "search of a Goan self", the late Professor Emeritus of English Literature at Washington DC, Eusebio C. Rodrigues has referred to his work, saying he (Manuel C. Rodrigues) "has two collections of poems with significant titles: Songs in Exile and Homeward."

Writing in an essay titled 'Saudades and the Goan Poetic Temper: Globalising Goan Cultural History', in the book Goa and Portugal: History and Development, Victor Anand Coelho, Professor of Music and Chairman of the Department of Musicology and Ethnomusicology at Boston University, writes: "...George C. Coelho probed other things within this rich corpus of poetry such as nostalgia which manifests in [Goan] Christian poets like Armando Menezes (1902–83), Manoel C. Rodrigues (1908–91) and Joseph Furtado (1872–1947) and the theme of exile which carries with it the theme of longing for homeland and voyage, but also takes on a political function."

Family home and family

His two-centuries old family home is located in the coastal village turned tourist-destination of Calangute just off the Baga-Calangute Road near the Our Lady of Piety Chapel.

His brother, the much-awarded Olimpio Coleto Rodrigues, who was born in 1915, is also considered to be a world renowned Goan artist and avid collector of antique furniture and objects who "Indianised" Christian Art. According to media reports, in 1950 he was awarded the opportunity to paint a fresco just 200 yards from the Sistine Chapel within the Vatican.

References

1908 births
1991 deaths
Poets from Goa
20th-century Indian poets